The Theatre Army Productions is a North (Punjab/Chandigarh) based production house which was founded by Gabbar Sangrur. This complete line production company has successfully handled line production of Hollywood, Bollywood and Pollywood movies such as West is West, Teen Thay Bhai, Mausam, Love Express, Student of the Year, Surkhaab, Sikander, Stupid Seven,  and Yamley Jatt Yamley. In April 2013 it came with a Punjabi movie Heer & Hero  under its banner and did line production for upcoming movie Santa Banta featuring Boman Irani and Vir Das.

Biography

The Theatre Army is the brainchild of Gabbar and was formed in 2007. Hailing from Lehragaga, Sangrur district, Gabbar used to do theatre with well-known theatre artist Samuel John until he moved to Chandigarh for doing his post graduation in theatre from Department of Indian Theatre, Panjab University.

He directed a few music videos, followed by getting the big break of handling the line production of the Hollywood movie West is West, which is a British comedy-drama film and the sequel to the award-winning comedy East is East. West is West was set in Pakistan but it was actually shot in Punjab. At its premiere in Chandigarh in 2010, Udwin thanked Gabbar and his team. Line production includes hunting for locales, striking deals with locals, arranging for commute for a film's cast and crew, arranging their boarding and lodging, importing equipments and goods, transportation, catering, movie set construction, security, getting permissions, and arranging all production services.

Projects

After West is West, the Theatre Army has handled line production of various national and international projects such as Udta Punjab (Hindi), Vivek Kumar and Barkha Madan’s Surkhaab (Indo-Canadian) and Nanak Shah Faqir (Hindi). Surkhaab which is based on Canada's illegal immigrants is on the festival circuit and has already bagged a Platinum Remi at Houston Film Fest, and will be screened in Nice, France, as part of the St Tropez International Film Festival.

The list of Bollywood movies includes Teen Thay Bhai, Love Express, Student of the Year and Mausam.

Pankaj Kapoor’s Mausam, which was divided into three parts, certainly had the most enjoyable first part which was shot in Punjab. It was well received and the Theatre Army’s work was admired. The Pollywood projects of The Theatre Army include Jawani Zindabad, Channa Sachi Muchi, Veeran Naal Sardari, Pinky Moge Wali, Yamley Jatt Yamley, Stupid Seven and Sikander.

Heer & Hero, the debut Punjabi movie of Minissha Lamba, is under production by the Theatre Army.

Their list of television projects includes Guinness World Record, India's Got Talent, Rattan ka Rishta, Veena Malik Ka Swayambar and The Bachelorette India - Mere Khayalon Ki Mallika.

Filmography
{| class="wikitable"
|-
! Films !! Language !! Role
|-
| West is West || English || Line producer
|-
| 'Mausam || Hindi || Line producer
|-
| Teen Thay Bhai || Hindi || Line producer
|-
| Nanak Shah Fakir || Hindi || Line producer
|-
| Santa Banta || Hindi || Line producer
|-
| 31 October || Hindi || Line producer
|-
| Surkhaab || Indo-Canadian || Line producer
|-
| Heer & Hero || Punjabi || Line producer
|-
| Needhi Singh || Punjabi || Line producer
|-
| Mahi NRI || Punjabi || Line producer
|-
| Baaz || Punjabi || Line producer
|-
| Yaaran Da Katchup || Punjabi || Line producer
|-
| Pinky Mogey Wali || Punjabi || Line producer
|-
| Sikander || Punjabi || Line producer
|-
| dta Punjab || Hindi || Line producer
|-
| Daana Pani (upcoming)|| Punjabi || Line producer
|-
| Yamley Jatt Yamley''|| Punjabi || Line producer
|}

'''Also associated with

References

Film production companies of Punjab, India
Mass media companies established in 2007
2007 establishments in Punjab, India
Indian companies established in 2007